The women's triple jump  at the 1991 IAAF World Indoor Championships was held on 9 March. This event was held for the first time at the World Indoor Championships, and as it was a demonstration event, the medals won here did not count towards the total score in the medal table.

Results

References

Triple
Triple jump at the World Athletics Indoor Championships
1991 in women's athletics